The Centreville Armory in Centreville, Maryland, is part of a series of Maryland National Guard armories built in the 1920s in principal towns in Maryland. The armories followed a standard design with a castle-like front housing offices and meeting spaces, backed by a large drill hall.

The armory was listed on the National Register of Historic Places in 1985.

References

External links
, including photo in 1980, at Maryland Historical Trust]

Armories on the National Register of Historic Places in Maryland
Government buildings completed in 1926
Buildings and structures in Queen Anne's County, Maryland
National Register of Historic Places in Queen Anne's County, Maryland
1926 establishments in Maryland